This is a list of suburbs in the Auckland metropolitan area, New Zealand, surrounding the Auckland Central Business District. They are broadly grouped into the local government areas that existed from 1989 to 2010.

Auckland central 
This area is the former Auckland City.

Arch Hill
Auckland CBD
Avondale
Blockhouse Bay
Balmoral
Blackpool
Eden Terrace
Eden Valley
Ellerslie
Epsom
Freemans Bay
Glendowie
Glen Innes
Grafton
Greenlane
Greenwoods Corner
Grey Lynn
Herne Bay
Hillsborough
Kingsland
Kohimarama
Lynfield
Meadowbank
Mission Bay
Morningside
Mount Albert
Mount Eden
Mount Roskill
Mount Wellington
Newmarket
Newton
New Windsor
Onehunga
Oneroa
Onetangi
One Tree Hill
Ōrākei
Oranga
Ostend
Ōtāhuhu
Owairaka
Palm Beach
Panmure
Parnell
Penrose
Point England
Point Chevalier
Ponsonby
Remuera
Royal Oak
Saint Heliers
St Johns
Saint Marys Bay
Sandringham
Stonefields
Surfdale
Tāmaki
Te Papapa
Three Kings
Waikowhai
Wai o Taiki Bay
Waterview
Wesley
Western Springs
Westfield
Westmere

North Shore
This area is the former North Shore City.

Albany
Bayswater
Bayview
Beach Haven
Belmont
Birkdale
Birkenhead
Browns Bay
Campbells Bay
Castor Bay
Chatswood
Cheltenham
Crown Hill
Devonport
Fairview Heights
Forrest Hill
Glenfield
Greenhithe
Hauraki
Highbury
Hillcrest
Long Bay
Mairangi Bay
Marlborough
Milford
Murrays Bay
Narrow Neck
Northcote
Northcote Point
North Harbour
Northcross
Okura
Oteha
Paremoremo
Pinehill
Rosedale
Rothesay Bay
Schnapper Rock
Stanley Bay
Stanley Point
Sunnynook
Takapuna
Torbay
Totara Vale
Unsworth Heights
Waiake
Wairau Valley
Westlake
Windsor Park

South Auckland and eastern suburbs
This area is the former Manukau City.

Airport Oaks
Beachlands
Botany Downs
Brookby
Bucklands Beach
Burswood
Chapel Downs
Clendon Park
Clevedon
Clover Park
Cockle Bay
Dannemora
East Tāmaki
East Tāmaki Heights
Eastern Beach
Farm Cove
Favona
Flat Bush
Golflands
Goodwood Heights
Greenmeadows
Half Moon Bay
Highland Park
Hillpark
Howick
Huntington Park
Kawakawa Bay
Mahia Park
Māngere
Māngere Bridge
Māngere East
Manukau
Manukau Heights
Manurewa
Manurewa East
Maraetai
Meadowlands
Mellons Bay
Middlemore
Murphys Heights
Northpark
Orere Point
Ormiston
Ōtara
Pakuranga
Pakuranga Heights
Papatoetoe
Randwick Park
Settlers Cove
Shamrock Park
Shelly Park
Silkwood Heights
Somerville
Sunnyhills
The Gardens
Totara Heights
Tuscany Estate
Waimahia Landing
Wattle Cove
Wattle Downs
Weymouth
Whitford
Wiri

Papakura
This area is the former Papakura District.

Alfriston
Ardmore
Conifer Grove
Drury
Longford Park
Ōpaheke
Pahurehure
Papakura
Runciman
Red Hill
Rosehill
Takanini

Pukekohe
This area is part of the former Franklin District.

Ararimu
Āwhitu
Bombay
Buckland
Clarks Beach
Hunua
Karaka
Karaka Harbourside
Kingseat
Manukau Heads
Paerata
Paparimu
Patumahoe
Pollok
Pukekohe
Waiau Pa
Waiuku

West Auckland
This area is the former Waitakere City.
  
Anawhata
Cornwallis
Bethells Beach
Glen Eden
Glendene
Green Bay
Henderson
Henderson Valley
Herald Island
Hobsonville
Huia
Karekare
Kaurilands
Kelston
Konini
Laingholm
Lincoln
McLaren Park
Massey
New Lynn
Oratia
Parau
Piha
Rānui
Royal Heights
Sunnyvale
Swanson
Te Atatū Peninsula
Te Atatū South
Titirangi
Waiatarua
Westgate
West Harbour
Western Heights
Whenuapai

Rodney
This area is the former Rodney District.

Algies Bay
Arkles Bay
Army Bay
Big Omaha
Dairy Flat
Dome Forest
Dome Valley
Glorit
Gulf Harbour
Hatfields Beach
Helensville
Huapai
Kaipara Flats
Kaukapakapa
Kumeū
Leigh
Mahurangi East
Mahurangi West
Mangakura
Manly
Makarau
Matakana
Matakatia
Millwater
Muriwai
Omaha
Orewa
Parakai
Pakiri
Point Wells
Port Albert
Puhoi
Red Beach
Redvale
Riverhead
Sandspit
Shelly Beach
Silverdale
Snells Beach
South Head
Stanmore Bay
Tapora
Tauhoa
Taupaki
Tāwharanui Peninsula
Te Arai
Te Hana
Ti Point
Tindalls Beach
Tomarata
Wade Heads
Waimauku
Wainui
Waitoki
Waiwera
Warkworth
Whangaparaoa
Whangaripo
Whangateau
Wharehine
Wellsford
Woodhill Forest

See also
Jafa (includes discussion of some suburb-based Auckland stereotypes)